Looking for Clancy was a 1975 television serial broadcast on BBC2.

Based on Frederic Mullally's 1971 novel Clancy, it was dramatised in five parts by Jack Pulman and starred Robert Powell, Keith Drinkel and T. P. McKenna. Produced by Richard Beynon, the serial was directed by Bill Hays and broadcast on Saturdays, with repeats the following Thursday. The serial was repeated in 1977.

Cast 
 Robert Powell – Frank Clancy
 Keith Drinkel - Dick Holt
 T. P. McKenna – Marcus Selby
 Catherine Schell - Penny Clancy
 Eileen Helsby - Lucy Caldwell
 John Blythe - Ted Shatto
 John Junkin - Jim Clancy
 James Grout - Dai Owen
 Rosemary Martin - Aunt Rita
 Barbara Young- Eileen Clancy
 Paul Aston - Gordon Clancy
 Gwen Nelson - Meg Mace
 Mavis Walker - Madge
 John Nightingale - Michael Clancy
 James Bree - Guy Wall
 Peter Halliday - Sam Cook

Episodes

Title song 
The title song of the same name was written by Brian Wade and Tony Cliff. It was released as a 7” single by Susanne and Me on the Beeb label, (Beeb 006) in 1975, with Like A Picture Show (prod. Mike Harding) on the B-side. The song also appeared on the 1976 album Angels and 15 other Original BBC TV Themes (BBC Records, REB 236).

References

External links 

1975 British television series debuts
1975 British television series endings